UFC 71: Liddell vs. Jackson 2 was a mixed martial arts event held by the Ultimate Fighting Championship. The event took place on Saturday, May 26, 2007, at the MGM Grand Garden Arena in Las Vegas, Nevada.

Background
The main event was the rematch between UFC Light Heavyweight Champion Chuck Liddell and Quinton "Rampage" Jackson. At the time of the event, Jackson was the only fighter to have an unavenged victory over Liddell, which occurred at PRIDE Final Conflict 2003 by TKO.

The UFC announced during the broadcast of the card that the winner of the Jackson vs.  Liddell bout will face PRIDE 93 kg and 83 kg Champion Dan Henderson. 

Mainstream sports media, especially ESPN, began extensive coverage of the UFC on this event. ESPN broadcast live the weigh-ins and post-fight coverage for UFC 71 on ESPNEWS.

Alan Belcher replaced Eric Schafer for his fight against Sean Salmon due to an injury.

Results

Bonus awards
After every UFC event, bonuses are given to fighters who perform well.

The bonuses for this event were $40,000 each.

Fight of the Night: Chris Leben vs. Kalib Starnes
Knockout of the Night: Quinton Jackson
Submission of the Night: Din Thomas

See also
 Ultimate Fighting Championship
 List of UFC champions
 List of UFC events
 2007 in UFC

References

External links

Official UFC 71 website
Official UFC 71 Fight Card

Ultimate Fighting Championship events
2007 in mixed martial arts
Mixed martial arts in Las Vegas
2007 in sports in Nevada
MGM Grand Garden Arena